Erebus felderi is a moth of the family Erebidae. It is found in Indonesia (Seram, Buru).

References

Moths described in 1922
Erebus (moth)
Moths of Indonesia